Clariond is a surname. Notable people with the surname include:

Benjamín Clariond, Mexican politician affiliated with the Institutional Revolutionary Party
Fernando Canales Clariond (born 1946), Mexican politician and businessman affiliated with the National Action Party (PAN)
Jacques Antoine Clariond, Mexican businessman

See also
Clarion (disambiguation)